Béatrice Didier (born 21 December 1935 in La Tronche, Isère) is a French literary critic.

Biography
Didier was a professor of literature and a publishing series director. She earned a literary doctorate in 1965. She is also a Professor Emeritus of École normale supérieure (ENS), where she headed a seminary exposing the relationship between literature and music.

Didier is a specialist of the French literature of the 17th and 18th centuries (especially Senancour, Chateaubriand, Stendhal and George Sand) as well as of autobiographical works.

She edited and published numerous works, and contributed to the Europe magazine. She headed the series  "Écrivains", "Écriture" and "Écrit" of the Presses Universitaires de France.

She is the deputy chairwoman of the Société Chateaubriand.

Works
 
 Chateaubriand avant le Génie du christianisme (ed.), Champion, 2006
 Oberman ou le sublime négatif (ed.), Presse de l'ENS, 2006
 Stendhal ou la dictée du bonheur, Klincksieck, 2004
 D’une gaîté ingénieuse : l’Histoire de Gil Blas roman de Lesage, Louvain ; Dudley, MA: Peeters, 2004. 
 Gil Blas de Lesage, Gallimard, Paris, 2002
 Stendhal et l'État (dir.), Cirvi, Turin, 2002
 Le Journal intime, PUF, "Littératures modernes", 2002
 Dictionnaire de littérature grecque ancienne et moderne, PUF, series "Quadrige", ed. Béatrice Didier and Jacqueline de Romilly, 2001
 Diderot dramaturge du vivant, PUF, "Écriture", 2001
 Jean-Jacques Origas & Béatrice Didier, Dictionnaire de littérature japonaise, PUF, Quadrige, 2000
 L'Écriture-femme, PUF, "Écriture", 1999
 George Sand écrivain : un grand fleuve d'Amérique, PUF, 1998
 Alphabet et raison. Le paradoxe des dictionnaires au XVIIIe siècle, PUF, "Écriture", 1996
 Histoire de la littérature française du XVIIIe siècle, Nathan, 1992 
 La Littérature de la Révolution française, PUF, "Que sais-je?", No. 2418, 1988
 Le Siècle des Lumières, MA Éditions, 1987
 La Voix de Marianne, essai sur Marivaux, José Corti, 1987
 La Musique des Lumières : Diderot, l'Encyclopédie, Rousseau, PUF, 1985
 Un dialogue à distance : Gide et Du Bos, 1977
 Sade, Denoël, 1976

Awards and distinctions
Commandeur of the Ordre des Palmes académiques
Commandeur of the National Order of Merit
Officer of the National Order of Merit
1977: Académie française's Montyon Prize for her work Un dialogue à distance : Gide et Du Bos
1983: Grand prix de la Critique littéraire

References

External links
Official website 
Béatrice Didier, cairn.info
Béatrice Didier, Persée

20th-century French women
21st-century French women
French literary critics
Women literary critics
French women critics
Academic staff of the École Normale Supérieure
French book publishers (people)
20th-century publishers (people)
21st-century publishers (people)
Officers of the Ordre national du Mérite
Commandeurs of the Ordre des Palmes Académiques
1935 births
People from Isère
Living people